The Tri-State Warbird Museum is a private, not-for-profit aviation museum located in Batavia, Ohio, in Clermont County next to the Clermont County Airport.

Overview 
The focus of the museum is on World War II, therefore, all aircraft at the museum are from this time period. The goal of the museum is to preserve and operate these aircraft, as a result, all either are flyable or will be made flyable. The museum publishes a newsletter called "Taking Flight" approximately 1 or 2 times per year. Every June, a fundraising gala is held by the museum. A World War II period barracks exhibit is also on display at the museum.

History 
The museum was formed in 2003 by David O'Maley Sr. and opened to the public on 21 May 2005. O'Maley is a former CEO of Ohio National Life Insurance Company.

In 2006, a TBM Avenger aircraft operated by the museum taxied into a homebuilt plane at the 2006 Oshkosh fly in. A passenger in the homebuilt was killed. The NTSB investigation faulted the Avenger pilot.

The museum's North American B-25 Mitchell was featured on October 16, 2010 in a flyover of the Virginia Tech football game.

In 2011, due to a large donation, a second hangar was built at the museum to provide additional space for aircraft.

The museum's P-40 was involved in an accident on 8 December 2011, shortly after being restored to flight status. The aircraft experienced an engine failure and had to be glided back to the airport from an altitude of 6,500 feet. Upon landing it overran the runway, went through a fence and came to rest on a nearby road.

The museum's B-25 and P-51 performed flyovers at a Virginia Tech football game on 22 September 2012.

Three World War II veterans received the French Legion of Honour at an event held at the museum on 12 February 2013.

The museum's B-25 performed a flyover for Doolittle Raider Tom Griffin's funeral on 9 March 2013.

The museum's B-25 performed the flyover for the Cincinnati Reds opening day on 1 April 2013.

The museum's B-25 performed the flyover for the opening ceremonies of the Indianapolis 500 with five T-6s from the Cincinnati Warbirds on 26 May 2013.

The museum's B-25 performed part of the flyover for the final toast of the Doolittle Raiders at the National Museum of the United States Air Force on 9 November 2013.

The museum's B-25 took part in an event in Kansas City, Missouri on 14 June 2014.

The museum's P-40 won the World War II Grand Champion award at the EAA AirVenture Oshkosh airshow in 2016.

The museum's P-51 performed a flyover at Wright Memorial Hill for the 113th anniversary of the Wright Brothers first flight on 16 December 2016.

Aircraft on display

Airworthy 

 Beechcraft TC-45H Expeditor 51-11529
 Boeing-Stearman N2S-3 75-7899
 Curtiss P-40M Kittyhawk 43-5813
 Eastern TBM-3E Avenger 53420
 Focke-Wulf Fw 190 F-8 583-661 – Replica
 North American AT-6D Texan 42-84779
 North American TB-25N Mitchell 45-8898
 North American P-51D Mustang 44-84410
 Piper J3C Cub 22743
 Piper L-4H Grasshopper 43-29332

Under Restoration 

 Goodyear FG-1D Corsair 92132

Other Vehicles 

 Link AN-T-18 Trainer 4936
 CJ-2A Jeep 204386

See also
List of aerospace museums
List of museums in Ohio

References

Further reading

Magazine

Newspaper

External links

 

Museums in Clermont County, Ohio
Aerospace museums in Ohio
Military and war museums in Ohio
Museums established in 2003
2003 establishments in Ohio